Haim Gouri  (Gurfinkel; 9 October 1923 – 31 January 2018) was an Israeli poet, novelist, journalist, and  documentary filmmaker. Widely regarded as one of the country's greatest poets, he was awarded the Israel Prize for poetry in 1988, as well as being the recipient of several other prizes of national distinction.

Biography

Haim Gurfinkel (later Gouri) was born in Tel Aviv.  After studying at the Kadoorie Agricultural High School, he joined the Palmach and completed a commander's course. He participated in the bombing of a British radar station being used to track Aliyah Bet ships carrying illegal Jewish immigrants to Palestine. In 1947 he was sent to Hungary to bring Holocaust survivors to Mandate Palestine. During the 1948 Arab–Israeli War he was a deputy company commander in the Palmach's Negev Brigade.

Gouri studied literature at the Hebrew University of Jerusalem and the Sorbonne in Paris. As a journalist he worked for LaMerhav and later, Davar.  He achieved fame with his coverage of the 1961 trial of Adolf Eichmann.

Family
Gouri lived with his wife, Aliza, in Jerusalem. Gouri died on 31 January 2018, at the age of 94.

Literary career
Gouri's first published poem, Day Voyage, appeared in Mishmar, edited by Abraham Shlonsky, in 1945. His first complete volume of poetry, Flowers of Fire, was published in 1949 following the 1948 Arab-Israeli War.

Some poems that Gouri wrote became an inseparable part of the Israeli ethos. One of his most famous poems, "Behold, here our bodies lie", was written in the time of Israel's war for independence (1948-1949) to commemorate the 35 soldiers who were killed on their way to the besieged Gush Etzion settlements. Gouri also wrote a few famous popular songs such as "The Comradeship" that became representative of Israel's war for independence.

Awards and recognition

 In 1961, Gouri obtained the Sokolow Award for Israeli Journalism.
 The film The 81st Blow, which he wrote, co-produced, and co-directed, was nominated for the 1974 Academy Award for Documentary Feature. It is part of a  powerful Holocaust trilogy that includes The Last Sea and Flames in the Ashes. 
 In 1975, Gouri was awarded the Bialik Prize for literature.
 In 1988, he was awarded the Israel Prize, for Hebrew poetry. 
 In 1998, he won the Uri Zvi Grinberg award.
In 2004, he was awarded the Prime Minister's Prize for Hebrew Literary Works.
 In 2016, Gouri rejected an award from the Israeli Ministry of Culture and Sport of the annual 50,000 shekel prize for “Zionist works of art”.

Published works

Poetry 
 Flowers of Fire, Hakibbutz Hameuchad (1949)
 Till Dawn, Hakibbutz Hameuchad (1950)
 Poems of the Seal, Hakibbutz Hameuchad (1954)
 Compass Rose, Hakibbutz Hameuchad (1960)
 Gehazi Visions, Hakibbutz Hameuchad (1967)
 Movement to Touch, Hakibbutz Hameuchad (1968)
 The Eagle Line, Hakibbutz Hameuchad (1975)
 Summer's End, Hakibbutz Hameuchad  (1985)
 The One Who Came After Me, Hakibbutz Hameuchad  (1993)
 Words in My Love-Sick Blood (selected poems in English translation). Detroit: Wayne State University, 1996, .
 The Poems, in two volumes, Bialik Institute (1998)
 Late Poems, Hakibbutz Hameuchad, (2002) 
 I Am a Civil War, Daniella  De-Nur, Hakibbutz Hameuchad, (2004).
 Eyval, Hakibbutz Hameuchad, (2009) 
 Though I Wished for More of More, Hakibbutz Hameuchad, Daniella De-Nur, (2015)

Fiction 
 The Chocolate Deal, Hakibbutz Hameuchad (1965). English translations: New York: Holt, Rinehart & Winston, 1968, . Detroit: Wayne State University Press, 1999, .
 The Crazy Book. Am Oved Publishers, (1971)
 The Interrogation, The Story of Reuel. Am Oved Publishers, (1980)
 Who Knows Joseph G?, Hakibbutz Hameuchad (1980)

Non-fiction 
 Pages of Jerusalem Hakibbutz Hameuchad, notes (1968)
 Facing the Glass Booth: the Jerusalem Trial of Adolf Eichmann (1962). English translation: Detroit: Wayne State University, 2004, .
 The Imprint of Memory, Hakibbutz Hameuchad, Bialik Institute, (2015).

Documentary films
 The 81st Blow (Ha-Makah Hashmonim V'Echad, 1974), distributed with English subtitles by "American Federation of Jewish Fighters, Camp Inmates and Nazi Victims"
 The Last Sea (Ha-Yam Ha'Aharon, 1980)
 Flames in the Ashes (Pnei Hamered, 1985)

See also 
Hareut
Hebrew literature
Sokolov Award
List of Israel Prize recipients
List of Bialik Prize recipients

References

External links
 "Haim Gouri" (capsule biography and bibliography) at the Institute for Translation of Hebrew Literature.
 
 " Hebrew article about the poet in later life, retrieved from ynet 28 November 2012.

1923 births
2018 deaths
Palmach members
Israeli journalists
Israeli poets
Israeli documentary filmmakers
Israel Prize in Hebrew poetry recipients
Recipients of Prime Minister's Prize for Hebrew Literary Works
People from Tel Aviv